The Nightlife is a dance-themed television series originally airing on TeenNick. It is hosted by Nick Cannon, Aaron Fresh, and Chloe Wang (now professionally known as Chloe Bennet). The series premiered on August 5, 2010, after a new episode of Degrassi. It was canceled shortly after and aired its final episode on August 26, 2010.

Guests over the four episodes were Ice Cube, Anna Kendrick, Brandon Routh, Vita Chambers, T.I., Landon Liboiron, Travie McCoy, The School Grylz, Iyaz, & The New Boyz.

External links
 Former website

References

2010 American television series debuts
2010 American television series endings
2010s American variety television series
English-language television shows